NA-43 (Tribal Area-IV) is a constituency for the National Assembly of Pakistan comprising Jamrud Subdivision, Landi Kotal Subdivision, and Mula Gori Subdivision of Khyber District.

Members of Parliament

2002–2018: NA-45 (Tribal Area-X)

Since 2018: NA-43 (Tribal Area-IV)

Election 2002 

General elections were held on 10 Oct 2002. Noor-ul-Haq Qadri an Independent candidate won by 9,121 votes.

Election 2008 

The result of general election 2008 in this constituency is given below.

Result 
Noor Ul Haq Qadri succeeded in the election 2008 and became the member of National Assembly.

Election 2013 

General elections were held on 11 May 2013. Shah Ji Gul Afridi an Independent candidate won  by 29,697 votes and became the  member of National Assembly.

Election 2018 

General elections were held on 25 July 2018.

By-election 2023 
A by-election will be held on 16 March 2023 due to the resignation of Noor-ul-Haq Qadri, the previous MNA from this seat.

See also
NA-42 (Tribal Area-III)
NA-44 (Tribal Area-V)

References

External links 
 Election result's official website

43
43